Aljaž Bedene was the defending champion but lost in the quarterfinals to Mikael Ymer.

Ymer won the title after defeating Grégoire Barrère 6–3, 7–5 in the final.

Seeds
All seeds receive a bye into the second round.

Draw

Finals

Top half

Section 1

Section 2

Bottom half

Section 3

Section 4

References

External links
Main Draw
Qualifying Draw

Singles